is a Japanese footballer currently playing as a defender for Mito HollyHock as a designated special player.

Career statistics

Club
.

Notes

References

External links

1999 births
Living people
Association football people from Kanagawa Prefecture
Aoyama Gakuin University alumni
Japanese footballers
Association football defenders
J2 League players
Yokohama F. Marinos players
Mito HollyHock players